Bozoğlak is a village the district of Kastamonu, Kastamonu Province, Turkey. Its population is 192 (2021).

References

Villages in Kastamonu District